Weird Science is an American television sitcom, based on John Hughes' 1985 film of the same title, that aired on the USA Network from March 5, 1994, to April 11, 1997. Six previously unaired, "lost" episodes aired on the Sci-Fi Channel from July 11 to 25, 1998.

Plot
The series follows the adventures of Gary Wallace (John Mallory Asher) and Wyatt Donnelly (Michael Manasseri), two socially inept high-school students in a fictional California town. Together, using Wyatt's computer, they try to create a computer simulation of a perfect woman in order to practice communicating with girls. However, a freak lightning storm brings her to life, creating Lisa (Vanessa Angel), a gorgeous genius with the powers of a "magic genie".

In the pilot episode, Gary claims that creating Lisa is possible because he "saw it in a John Hughes movie", referring to the original Weird Science film.

Cast
 John Mallory Asher replaces Anthony Michael Hall in the role of Gary Wallace. Like his film counterpart, Gary is a poor student and a slacker, always looking for shortcuts to get what he wants (usually to impress girls). Gary is a nice guy and nerdy. Sometimes he is successful with women. His father, Al (Jeff Doucette) is a mechanic and tow-truck driver. His mother Emily is played by Joyce Bulifant, Asher's real life mother.
 Michael Manasseri replaces Ilan Mitchell-Smith in the role of Wyatt Donnelly. Wyatt's wealthy parents are usually out of town, leaving him and his older brother Chett alone in the house. Most stories have him as the more cautious member of the group, more reluctant than Gary to use Lisa's magic. A few more seasons, he was more dependent and more excited for Lisa to help them out. Just like Gary, they are labeled as nerds and outsiders. He is more popular with girls than Gary, and several episodes feature Gary being interested in a girl who likes Wyatt instead.
 Vanessa Angel replaces Kelly LeBrock in the role of Lisa. She describes herself as a "magic genie", able to grant the boys' wishes, though she does this out of choice rather than duty and is free to deny them any wish she does not want to grant. Once she grants a wish, Lisa is unable to reverse it, no matter how badly it turns out; however, most of her spells wear off after an indeterminate amount of time. Other than those basic rules, the limits of her powers are never clearly defined, and she seems to get more or less powerful depending on what a particular episode's plot requires. Although she is physically manifested, she is apparently still a program running on Wyatt's computer, and she ceases to appear if the computer is switched off. She is addicted to Chunky Monkey ice cream. She is more like the big sister or mother figure of the series to the boys.  
 Lee Tergesen replaces Bill Paxton in the role of Chester "Chett" Donnelly. Chett is a military school graduate who turned down his commission, claiming that he did not want to be sent overseas to work for "Third-World slackers"; he lives with his parents and shows no interest in moving out or getting a job. Paranoid and angry, he takes out his frustrations on Wyatt and Gary, though less sadistically than in the movie; mostly he takes Wyatt's things without asking and calls him names like "wuss-boy" and "pit-lick". He also has a vendetta against Scampi (Bruce Jarchow), principal of the boys' high school, whom he remembers when he was "Ass-istant Principal Scampi". It was finally revealed in the series finale that Scampi is indeed Chett's true biological father since he met Marcia before she and Wayne got married. Most episodes have Chett getting caught up unwittingly in the magical shenanigans, often getting hurt or transformed without knowing what is going on. In the fourth season episode, "Master Chett," to expand Tergesen's role, Chett was let in on the secret of Lisa's existence; it was explained that Lisa had so often erased parts of his memory that he had developed a mental callus, making him immune to erasure. He occasionally has hints of sexual tension with Lisa. The two start to fall in love until she leaves him for Wyatt, with whom she subsequently breaks up.

Production
Weird Science was produced by St. Clare Entertainment in association with Universal Television. Premiering on March 1, 1994, the show ran for five seasons on the USA Network for a total of 88 episodes. However, new episodes ceased airing in 1997 with the final six still unaired. They would eventually air in the United States the following year on the Sci-Fi Channel; the show was also reran briefly on what was then the Fox Family Channel in 2001 and Encore Family in 2004.

The theme song for the series was "Weird Science" by Oingo Boingo, the same as that used in the movie (though they received no on-screen credit for the series).

John Hughes had no involvement with the television version of his film. The creators and showrunners of the series were Tom Spezialy and Alan Cross.

Kari Lizer, one of the staff writers, who later went on to create The New Adventures of Old Christine, said, "Weird Science turned out to be the best job because it made me realize I was more than an actress who could write monologues for herself. It turned me into a real writer because I had to write about things that weren’t close to home."

Seth Green was one of the finalists for the part of Gary. He later had a guest appearance in season 2 episode 1, "Lisa's Virus".

Six episodes that did not air during the series' original run on USA Network eventually aired on Syfy. The first two premiered July 11, 1998, with the remainder premiering as pairs of episodes July 18 and 25, 1998.

Episodes
 List of Weird Science episodes

International Airing
In France, the series was aired as Code Lisa on France 2 in 1995, later it was rebroadcast on MCM, NRJ 12 and Game One.

Home media
On January 1, 2008, A&E Home Video released the complete first and second seasons of Weird Science on DVD in Region 1.

The complete series was released on DVD in Australia on August 16, 2017.

References

External links
 
 

1994 American television series debuts
1998 American television series endings
1990s American comic science fiction television series
1990s American high school television series
1990s American single-camera sitcoms
1990s American teen sitcoms
Television series about artificial intelligence
English-language television shows
Live action television shows based on films
Television series about brothers
Television series about teenagers
Television series by Universal Television
USA Network original programming
Works about computer hacking